
Year 462 (CDLXII) was a common year starting on Monday (link will display the full calendar) of the Julian calendar. At the time it was known as the Year of the Consulship of Severus and Leo (or, less frequently, year 1215 Ab urbe condita). The denomination 462 for this year has been used since the early medieval period, when the Anno Domini calendar era became the prevalent method in Europe for naming years.

Events 
 By place 

 Roman Empire 
 September 1 – Possible start of the first Byzantine indiction cycle.
 Emperor Leo I pays a large ransom for Licinia Eudoxia and Placidia. They return after seven years of captivity in Carthage.
 The Monastery of Stoudios is founded in Constantinople.

 Asia 
 The Daming calendar is introduced in China by mathematician Zu Chongzhi (approximate date).

Births 
 Anicia Juliana, daughter of Olybrius
 Muryeong, king of Baekje (Korea)

Deaths 
 Licinia Eudoxia, Roman empress (b. 422)
 Lóegaire mac Néill, High King of Ireland

References